The 2007–08 Greek Basket League season was the 68th season of the Greek Basket League, the highest tier professional basketball league in Greece. The winner of the championship was Panathinaikos that won Olympiacos in the finals of the championship.

Teams

Regular season

Standings

Pts=Points, Pld=Matches played, W=Matches won, L=Matches lost, F=Points for, A=Points against, D=Points difference

Results

Playoffs
This is the outlook for the 2008 Α1 playoffs. Teams in italics have home advantage. Teams in bold advance to the next round. Numbers to the left of each team indicate the team's original playoffs seeding. Numbers to the right indicate the score of each game.

Play-offs

Final standings

Greek League Best Five

External links
 Official HEBA Site
 Official Hellenic Basketball Federation Site
 A1 League at Sportime magazine (Greek)
 Galanis Sports Data

Greek Basket League seasons
1
Greek